The 1904 United States presidential election in New Hampshire took place on November 8, 1904 as part of the 1904 United States presidential election. Voters chose four representatives, or electors to the Electoral College, who voted for president and vice president.

New Hampshire voted for the Republican nominee, President Theodore Roosevelt, over the Democratic nominee, former Chief Judge of New York Court of Appeals Alton B. Parker. Roosevelt won the state by a margin of 22.28 points.

Results

Results by county

See also
 United States presidential elections in New Hampshire

References

New Hampshire
1904
1904 New Hampshire elections